Budd F. Whitehall (February 6, 1932 – July 5, 1993) was an American football, wrestling and baseball coach and former player. He was a highly successful coach in multiple sports at Lock Haven University in Lock Haven, Pennsylvania and Lycoming College in Williamsport, Pennsylvania.

Prior to coaching, Whitehill played minor league baseball for two seasons (1953 to 1954).

Head coaching record

Football

References

External links
 
 

1932 births
1993 deaths
Lycoming Warriors baseball coaches
Lycoming Warriors football coaches
College wrestling coaches in the United States